Emery is a city in Hanson County, South Dakota, United States. It is part of the Mitchell, South Dakota Micropolitan Statistical Area. The population was 484 at the 2020 census.

History
The town was named for Sloan Miller (S.M.) Emery who filed a claim for the land that included the original town site in 1879. There was first settlement in the 1880s.

School
Emery has a K-12 school and was constructed in 1958, with additions in 1983, 1999, and 2016.

As with many small towns, high school athletics is a focus for the community. The boys basketball and football teams both have won state championships in their divisions.  The football team, Bridgewater-Emery/Ethan Seahawks, has won a combined 7 state championships (2001, 2003, 2007, 2010, 2011 and 2013 in 9-Man, 2019 in 11-man) and been runner-up 5 times (1993 and 2009 in 9-Man, 2017, 2018 and 2020 in 11-Man. The boys basketball team won in 1950, 1973 and 2017.

As of fall of 2010, the Emery school consolidated with Bridgewater, SD. The Emery and Bridgewater basketball, volleyball, track and golf teams continued their co-op which started in 2005. The football co-op with Ethan, has continued, adding Bridgewater.

Community amenities

Emery has a park facility which includes a swimming pool, baseball field, softball field, tennis court, basketball court & sand volleyball court. Emery is home to several businesses, including Cargill Ag Horizons, Total Stop Food Store, Sandy's Bar, and many more.

The city is also home to the Dimock-Emery Raptors amateur baseball team which plays in the South Dakota Amateur Baseball Association. The Raptors won the city's first ever amateur baseball championship in 2010.

Geography

Emery has been assigned the ZIP code 57332 and the FIPS place code 19420.

Demographics

2010 census
As of the census of 2010, there were 447 people, 191 households, and 116 families residing in the city. The racial makeup of the city was 98.4% White, 0.2% Native American, 0.4% Asian, and 0.9% from two or more races.

There were 191 households, of which 28.8% had children under the age of 18 living with them, 51.8% were married couples living together, 5.2% had a female householder with no husband present, 3.7% had a male householder with no wife present, and 39.3% were non-families. 35.1% of all households were made up of individuals, and 15.2% had someone living alone who was 65 years of age or older. The average household size was 2.34 and the average family size was 3.09.

The median age in the city was 37.9 years. 29.1% of residents were under the age of 18; 3.3% were between the ages of 18 and 24; 26.4% were from 25 to 44; 21.7% were from 45 to 64; and 19.5% were 65 years of age or older. The gender makeup of the city was 49.9% male and 50.1% female.

2000 census
As of the census of 2000, there were 439 people, 195 households, and 123 families residing in the city. The population density was 1,255.4 people per square mile (484.3/km2). There were 204 housing units at an average density of 583.4 per square mile (225.0/km2). The racial makeup of the city was 100.00% White.

There were 195 households, out of which 27.7% had children under the age of 18 living with them, 55.9% were married couples living together, 5.6% had a female householder with no husband present, and 36.9% were non-families. 34.9% of all households were made up of individuals, and 25.6% had someone living alone who was 65 years of age or older. The average household size was 2.25 and the average family size was 2.95.

In the city, the population was spread out, with 26.4% under the age of 18, 4.8% from 18 to 24, 23.5% from 25 to 44, 18.5% from 45 to 64, and 26.9% who were 65 years of age or older. The median age was 42 years. For every 100 females, there were 85.2 males. For every 100 females age 18 and over, there were 81.5 males.

The median income for a household in the city was $28,958, and the median income for a family was $35,313. Males had a median income of $27,875 versus $16,094 for females. The per capita income for the city was $17,324. About 3.8% of families and 5.2% of the population were below the poverty line, including none of those under age 18 and 16.9% of those age 65 or over.

Notable person
 Thomas H. Werdel, California politician
 Ezra Aderhold, Professional Disc Golfer

See also
 List of cities in South Dakota

References

External links

 

Cities in South Dakota
Cities in Hanson County, South Dakota
Mitchell, South Dakota micropolitan area